Zeitung vum Lëtzebuerger Vollek is a newspaper published in Luxembourg by the Communist Party of Luxembourg.

History and profile
Zeitung vum Lëtzebuerger Vollek was established in 1946. The paper is published in German language and is owned by the Communist Party of Luxembourg.

Zeitung vum Lëtzebuerger Vollek received €353,281 in annual state press subsidy in 2009.

The 2004 circulation of  the paper was 1,000 copies.

Footnotes

External links
 Zeitung vum Lëtzebuerger Vollek official website

1946 establishments in Luxembourg
Publications established in 1946
Communist newspapers published in Luxembourg
German-language communist newspapers
German-language newspapers published in Luxembourg
Daily newspapers published in Luxembourg